Ibino (also known as Ibono or Ibuno or Ibeno), is a Lower Cross River language of Nigeria. It is spoken in Ibeno LGA of Akwa Ibom State, Nigeria.

References

Lower Cross River languages